Holidays with Pay (Sea) Convention, 1936 is an International Labour Organization Convention. It never came into force.

It was established in 1936, with the preamble stating:
Having decided upon the adoption of certain proposals with regard to holidays with pay for seamen,...

Modification 

The principles contained in the convention were revised in by ILO Convention C72, Paid Vacations (Seafarers) Convention, 1946.

Ratifications
The convention did not receive enough ratifications to be brought into force.

External links 
Text.
Ratifications.

Employee benefits
International Labour Organization conventions
Holidays
Treaties concluded in 1936
Treaties not entered into force
Admiralty law treaties
1936 in labor relations